Ron Matthews (born 11 January 1983) is a Guyanese cricketer. He played in six first-class matches for Guyana in 2000/01.

See also
 List of Guyanese representative cricketers

References

External links
 

1983 births
Living people
Guyanese cricketers
Guyana cricketers
Sportspeople from Georgetown, Guyana